Julie Madelein Josephine Parisien (born August 2, 1971) is a former World Cup alpine ski racer from the United States. She specialized in the technical events of slalom and giant slalom. Parisien was the silver medalist in the slalom at the World Championships in 1993 and competed in three Olympics.

Born in Montreal, Quebec, Canada, Parisien's mother was born in Australia and her father, an orthopedic surgeon, in Canada. The family moved from Quebec to Maine when Julie was less than a year old. She and her three siblings were raised just outside Auburn, about a mile (1.6 km) from the Lost Valley Ski Area. On skis at age two, she followed her two older brothers and attended the Burke Mountain Academy in northeastern Vermont. Her siblings Rob (b.1970) and Anne-Lise (b.1972) also competed at the Olympics in alpine skiing. The eldest brother, Jean Paul (1968–92), captained the Williams College ski team and coached at Burke Mountain Academy. He was killed in a hit-and-run highway accident in December 1992, forced off the road by a drunk driver.

Parisien had won her third World Cup race in late November 1992 at Park City, and in the first two slalom events in January 1993 she placed fourth and sixth. She then won the silver medal in the slalom at the World Championships in Japan. But the loss of her brother affected her and she struggled in the 1994 season. After a disappointing 1994 Winter Olympics, Parisien left the U.S. Ski Team and competed on the women's pro tour in North America. She was rookie of the year in 1995 and finished second in the standings. Parisien dominated the pro tour next two years, then qualified for the 1998 Olympics, and finished 13th in the slalom at Nagano. At her first Olympics in 1992 in France, she held a slim lead after the first run in the slalom but finished fourth, missing a medal by 0.05 seconds.

After summer glacier training with the U.S. Ski Team in Europe, Parisien decided it was time to retire from competition in the fall  She was inducted into the Maine Sports Hall of Fame in 2001 and the National Ski Hall of Fame 

After finishing her career in competitive skiing, Parisien completed her degree in nursing. She graduated from the University of Southern Maine in 2003. As of 2023, Parisien resides in Kalispell, Montana where she works in gastroenterology.

World Cup results

Season standings

Race podiums 
 3 wins - (2 SL, 1 GS)
 4 podiums - (3 SL, 1 GS); 15 top tens (9 SL, 6 GS, 1 SG)

World Championship results

Olympic results

References

External links
 

 
 
 U.S. Ski Hall of Fame – Julie Parisien – inducted 2006
 
 Ski Museum of Maine Hall of Fame – Julie Parisien – inducted 2008

1971 births
Living people
American female alpine skiers
Olympic alpine skiers of the United States
Alpine skiers at the 1992 Winter Olympics
Alpine skiers at the 1994 Winter Olympics
Alpine skiers at the 1998 Winter Olympics
Skiers from Montreal
21st-century American women